Ryskino is the name of several rural localities in Russia:
Ryskino, Republic of Mordovia, a selo in Kazenno-Maydansky Selsoviet of Kovylkinsky District in the Republic of Mordovia; 
Ryskino, Tver Oblast, a village in Knyashchinskoye Rural Settlement of Vyshnevolotsky District in Tver Oblast